Campanula exigua, the chaparral bellflower, rock harebell, or Rattan campanula, is an annual flowering plant in the bellflower family Campanulaceae.

Distribution
The plant is endemic to Mount Diablo, in the northern Diablo Range within Contra Costa County, in the East Bay region of northern California.

It grows amongst other Mount Diablo and regional endemic plants, all dependent on natural fire ecology conditions.

Description
Campanula exigua sends up several long stems filled with milky sap and bearing sparse, tiny leaves.

At the end of each stem grows a bell-shaped bright blue-violet flower.  The bloom period is May and June.

References

External links
 Calflora Database: Campanula exigua (Chaparral harebell)
Jepson Manual eFlora (TJM2) treatment of Campanula exigua
 U.C. Photos gallery of Campanula exigua

exigua
Endemic flora of California
Mount Diablo
Natural history of the California chaparral and woodlands
Natural history of the California Coast Ranges
Natural history of Contra Costa County, California
Endemic flora of the San Francisco Bay Area